Springhead Halt railway station was a station on the former Hull and Barnsley Railway, close to the hamlet of Wolfreton; it served the village of Anlaby in the East Riding of Yorkshire, England.

The station opened on 8 April 1929 and closed on 1 August 1955.

The station had two 25-foot-long wooden platforms.

References

External links
 Springhead Halt station on navigable 1947 O. S. map

Disused railway stations in the East Riding of Yorkshire
Railway stations in Great Britain opened in 1929
Railway stations in Great Britain closed in 1955
Former London and North Eastern Railway stations